East Yaphank is a proposed station in the hamlet of East Yaphank, New York on the Main Line (Greenport Branch) of the Long Island Rail Road. The station would serve Brookhaven National Laboratory and would replace the existing Yaphank station.

History
On January 10, 2017, Governor Andrew Cuomo, as part of his State of the State Address, announced a proposal to build a station at Brookhaven National Laboratory for $20 million. The station is intended to serve the community of East Yaphank and Brookhaven National Laboratory. This proposal is intended to create jobs and stimulate economic growth in Suffolk County. As part of the April 2018 revision to the Metropolitan Transportation Authority's 2015–2019 Capital Program, the proposed station was renamed East Yaphank to better describe the station's potential location. The station will replace the stop at Yaphank, which is hard to find, according to local residents, and only has 30 daily riders.

Before the Governor's announcement, on July 21, 2016, elected officials from Brookhaven and the East End of Long Island had requested that the LIRR move the little-used stop at Yaphank to an industrial park near Brookhaven Technology Center and the William Floyd Parkway. In response, LIRR officials announced that the agency had been evaluating the potential relocation of the station as part of its Network Strategy Study.

In December 2018, the consulting contract for the project's Preliminary Design and Environmental Review was awarded to Gannet Fleming for $4,040,289. The consultant will identify and evaluate potential station sites, and 30% of the design of the station, which could be in electric territory later on. The environmental review is scheduled to be completed in December 2019, with procurement on the design-build contract scheduled for 2020. The remainder of the $20 million will be used for the second phase of the project, which will be the design-build portion of the project, including the removal of the Yaphank station.

References

External links 

Long Island Rail Road stations in Suffolk County, New York
Brookhaven, New York
Proposed Long Island Rail Road stations